Opisthoteuthis extensa is a species of octopus found off the west coast of Sumatra, an Indonesian island. O. extensa lives in a benthic habitat, like many other cirrate octopuses. It occupies a deep part of the ocean where little sunlight penetrates.

The species has not been studied in-depth; not much is known besides its habitat and anatomical description. It is only known from a single female specimen.

The type specimen, upon which the description is based, has small suckers, small eyes, and arms that do not vary much in length. The fins, which it uses for locomotion, are also very small. O. extensa may be the same species as Opisthoteuthis pluto.

References

Octopuses
Cephalopods of Asia
Molluscs of the Indian Ocean
Molluscs described in 1915
Species known from a single specimen